TSV Schwaben Augsburg is a German football club which is part of a larger sports association whose origins go back to the 1847 formation of the gymnastics club Turnverein Augsburg. The association's football department was formed in 1907 and after 29 March 1919 played as Schwaben Augsburg.



History
Local bylaws required the formation of a fire brigade and in 1848 the members of TV also formed the Augsburger Freiwillige Feuerwehr. In 1853, TV was banned for political reasons by authorities fearful of democratic leanings, but managed to carry on as a physical fitness group until being re-established in 1860. Some members left the club in 1863 to form MTV Augsburg, the first of several clubs spawned by the departure of TV including TSV 1871 Augsburg, TSV 1875 Göggingen, MTV 1889 Augsburg, and TSG 1890 Thannhausen. In 1907, former TV members also established FC Augsburg.

MTV 1863 Augsburg had re-united with its parent club in 1868 and in 1919, after the end of World War I, MTV 1889 also returned to the fold. That same year the club was also joined by the members of SV Augsburg which had been established in 1905 as FC Pfersee.

Interwar period
The comings and goings of TV club members continued in the interwar period. The women of Turnclub Augsburg and Damenschwimmverein Augsburg joined in 1919 and 1920 respectively. SV Schwaben was formed in 1924 by footballers, hockey players, and track and field athletes out of TV, while the fencers left in 1925 to form Fechtclub Augsburg. That same year TV partnered up with TSV 1925 Meitingen. TV offshoots SV Schwaben and SSV Augsburg (originally FC Augsburg) merged to become Sport- und Spielvereine (SSV) Schwaben Augsburg. And in 1933, FC Viktoria and Schwimmverein Delphi joined TV. Throughout this period the club's football side made frequent appearances in the Bezirksliga Bayern, but without producing any significant result.

Play during World War II
In 1933, German football was re-organized under the Third Reich into sixteen top-flight divisions. Schwaben Augsburg joined the Gauliga Bayern, but was relegated after just two seasons. The club returned to first division play in 1937, but again only stayed up for two years. Schwaben was promoted once more in 1940, while the team's parent club TV Augsburg was forced by Nazi sports authorities into a merger with SSV Schwaben Augsburg to form TSV Schwaben Augsburg in 1941. The football team remained in a weakened Gauliga until the end of World War II playing as a lower to mid-table side.

Postwar
After the war occupying Allied authorities ordered the dissolution of all organizations in Germany, including sports and football associations. Former TSV footballers formed FC Viktoria Augsburg (later 1948 TG Viktoria) in late 1945. TSV itself was re-constituted in 1946 and its own football department continued to compete in first division football in the Oberliga Süd in 15 of the next 20 years with their best result coming as a fifth-place finish in 1946. In this period, the club managed to march from the Oberliga straight down to the Amateurliga Bayern (III), and back, in consecutive seasons, an unusual archivemend. After the formation of the Bundesliga – Germany's first professional league – in 1963, the club played in the second division Regionalliga Süd until being relegated in 1969.

Out of professional football
That same year Schwaben's professional footballers left to join forces with their fellows at BC Augsburg to form FC Augsburg, while parent association TSV agreed to exclude themselves from participation in professional football in the future. Nonetheless Schwaben continued to operate a football department, being joined by the footballers of Eintracht Augsburg in 1970. The team went on to advance to the highest amateur class, the Bayernliga (IV), by 1981.

For many years from then, the club played as a yo-yo side moving between the Oberliga and the fifth division Landesliga Bayern-Süd. After one more relegation from the Oberliga in 2002, the club remained in the Landesliga. In 2007, it found itself back in the highest league of the Schwaben FA, the Bezirksoberliga Schwaben, for the first time since 1975. There the club struggled too and could not avoid further relegation, to the Bezirksliga Schwaben-Süd, in 2008.

In the Bezirksliga, the club met the BC Augsburg-Oberhausen, a club named and based on the old BC Augsburg. The team managed to break their fall through the leagues in 2008–09, finishing second behind BCA-O and earning promotion back to the Bezirksoberliga, where it played for the following three seasons.

At the end of the 2011–12 season, the club dropped back to the Bezirksliga after finishing 15th in the Bezirksoberliga but remained at the same tier as the Bezirksoberliga was disbanded. Schwaben long looked like achieving direct promotion back to the Landesliga in 2012–13 but eventually finished only second and was knocked out in the promotion play-off. Two successive league championships between 2015–16 and 2016–17 earned Schwaben promotion from the Bezirksliga to the Bayernliga Süd.

Honours
The club's honours:

League
 2nd Oberliga Süd (II)
 Champions: 1954
 Runners-up: 1961
 Bayernliga-Süd (III)
 Champions: 1959, 1960
 Landesliga Bayern-Süd (IV-V)
 Champions: 1991, 1998
 Runners-up: 1981, 1988, 2002
 Bezirksliga Schwaben-Süd (VII)
 Champions: 2016
 Runners-up: 2013

Cup
 Southern German Cup
 Winners: 1922
 Schwaben Cup
 Winners: 1959
 Runners-up: 1997

TSV Schwaben Augsburg seasons
The club's seasons since 1945:

With the introduction of the Bezirksoberligas in 1988 as the new fifth tier, below the Landesligas, all leagues below dropped one tier. With the introduction of the Regionalligas in 1994 and the 3. Liga in 2008 as the new third tier, below the 2. Bundesliga, all leagues below dropped one tier. With the establishment of the Regionalliga Bayern as the new fourth tier in Bavaria in 2012 the Bayernliga was split into a northern and a southern division, the number of Landesligas expanded from three to five and the Bezirksoberligas abolished. All leagues from the Bezirksligas onwards were elevated one tier.

International players
Players that have played internationally while playing for the club:
 Jānis Bebris, Latvian international
 Ernst Lehner, German international
 Ulrich Biesinger, German international
 Karl Burger, German international
 Oskar Rohr, German international

Stadium
From 1951 to 1965, Schwaben shared the Rosenaustadion with BC Augsburg until moving to the Sportanlage Süd. A new Ernst-Lehner-Stadion was built there in 1996 and named Ernst-Lehner-Stadion to honour the former player who was capped 65 times (55 while with Schwaben). He played in the 1934 and 1938 World Cups and was the second-most capped player for Germany in the first half of the century after Paul Janes.

Other sports departments
In addition to its football side Turn- und Sportverein Schwaben Augsburg participates in a large number of other sports including badminton, basketball, boxing, figure skating, fistball, fencing, ice hockey, canoeing and kayaking, athletics, tennis, table tennis, gymnastics, and winter sports. The club has enjoyed successes that include a gold medal in fencing for Heidi Schmid at the 1960 Olympic Games in Rome. Their most outstanding results have come in kayaking and include a silver medal at the 1972 Munich games and gold medals by club members Elisabeth Micheler (1992, Barcelona) and Oliver Fix (1996, Atlanta).

References

External links
Official team site – general 
Official team site – football 
Official team site – canoeing and kayaking 
Official team site – fencing 
Historical German domestic league results Das Deutsche Fussball-Archiv 
Schwaben Augsburg at Weltfussball.de 

Association football clubs established in 1907
Football clubs in Germany
Football clubs in Bavaria
TSV Schwaben Augsburg
FC Augsburg
Multi-sport clubs in Germany
Football in Swabia (Bavaria)
1847 establishments in Germany